Dastūr al-Mulūk by Moḥammad Rafiʿ Anṣāri known as Mirzā Rafiʿā is one of only three surviving administrative handbooks from early 18th-century Safavid Iran and an important research tool for scholars in Iranology. The Persian manuscript was edited during the 1960s by the Iranian scholar Mohammad Taqi Danesh Pajouh.

A Russian translation by Dr Vil'danova appeared in Tashkent, Uzbekistan, in the 1990s. In 2002, an annotated English translation, which contains also a facsimile of what was then thought among scholars to be the complete manuscript, was published and translated into English for the first time by the German scholar Christoph Marcinkowski, based on his dissertation. Already in 2000, this dissertation was awarded by then Iranian President Mohammad Khatami the First Prize for Best Research on Iranian Culture Award for the Year 2000 (International Category) by the Iranian Ministry of Culture. A Persian translation of Marcinkowski's 2002 study by Ali Kordabadi and Mansur Sefatgol appeared in 1385 AH solar (2006 CE) in Tehran at Markaz-e Asnad va Tarikh-e Diplomasi (published by the Iranian Ministry of Foreign Affairs). 

Subsequently, the Iranian scholar Iraj Afshar discovered and edited the remainder of the manuscript. This part, too, was translated into English and discussed by Dr. Marcinkowski in the Zeitschrift der Deutschen Morgenländischen Gesellschaft, the journal of the German Oriental Society (see below).

See also
Iranology
Safavids

Notes

Further reading
Christoph Marcinkowski (transl., ed.), Mirza Rafi‘a's Dastur al-Muluk: A Manual of Later Safavid Administration. Annotated English Translation, Comments on the Offices and Services, and Facsimile of the Unique Persian Manuscript (Kuala Lumpur: ISTAC, 2002).  [see also review by the late Professor Clifford Edmund Bosworth, F.B.A., in Acta Orientalia Academiae Scientiarum Hungaricae (Budapest, Hungary), vol. 58, no. 4 (2005), pp. 457–59.
idem, "Mirza Rafi‘a's Dastur al-Muluk. A Prime Source on Administration, Society and Culture in Late Safavid Iran," Zeitschrift der Deutschen Morgenländischen Gesellschaft (Germany), vol. 153, no. 2 (2003), pp. 281–310.
idem, "Mirza Rafi‘a's Dastur al-Muluk Again. Recently Discovered Additions to the Persian Manuscript," Zeitschrift der Deutschen Morgenländischen Gesellschaft (Germany), vol. 157, no. 2 (2007), pp. 395–416.
idem, "Dastur al-Moluk", Encyclopaedia Iranica, suppl. (New York NY, United States, Columbia University, ed. Ehsan Yarshater) (available online at http://www.iranicaonline.org/articles/dastur-al-moluk and also forthcoming in print).
Mirza Rafi‘a [Muhammad Rafi‘ Ansari], Dastur al-Muluk, Russian transl. A. B. Vil'danova (Tashkent: Izdatel'stvo Akademia Nauk Uzbekskoye SSR, 1991)
idem, Dastur al-moluk, microfilm in the Central Library of Tehran University, Pers. MS no. 1,357 (Sar-Yazdi-Library, ʿAbd-al-Raḥim Khan Madrasa, Yazd, Iran).

Area studies
18th century in Iran
Iranian culture
Safavid Iran